Marcus Porcius Cato (c. 73-42 BC), son of Cato the Younger by his first marriage to Atilia, was a Roman soldier and in his earlier years spent some time in politics with his father. Although he never achieved greatness, he was admired by close friends and relatives, and also served his father most loyally and shared his ideals. Marcus was renowned for being a man of gallantry and warm temperament.

Biography 
He was the brother of Porcia Catonis, who was first married to Marcus Calpurnius Bibulus (co-consul with Caesar in 59 BC); she later married their half-cousin (on the maternal side) Marcus Junius Brutus. Marcus fought in the Battle of Thapsus, and after being defeated by Caesar's forces his father Cato committed suicide in 46 BC. Julius Caesar pardoned young Cato and allowed him to keep his father's property.

In spite of being pardoned by Caesar and allowed to return home, Marcus joined his brother-in-law Brutus and his ally Gaius Cassius Longinus, who both assassinated Julius Caesar on March 15, 44 BC. Afterwards they fled Rome headed for Greece, where Marcus Cato fought in both of the battles of Philippi. He was killed in the second battle of Philippi in 42 BC (at the age of 31). According to Plutarch, as the army of the Liberators routed, Marcus refused to retreat and instead charged into the enemy ranks, allegedly without helmet or armor, to meet his death.

Family

References 

73 BC births
42 BC deaths
Marcus Porcius Cato (III)
1st-century BC Romans
Assassins of Julius Caesar
Ancient Romans killed in action
Cato the Younger